Hinotori (Japanese for Phoenix) may refer to:

 Hinotori (satellite), an astronomical satellite
 Hinotori (video game), a 1987 video game
 Hino Tori, a manga series by Osamu Tezuka
 The brand name of the Kintetsu 80000 series train type